The Lantz-Zeigler House is a historic home located at Hagerstown, Washington County, Maryland, United States. The house consists of a two-story stone main section built in 1800 with a two-story perpendicular ell to the rear. Also on the property are a stone outbuilding, a horse barn, and the site of a stone bridge built in 1824.

The Lantz-Zeigler House was listed on the National Register of Historic Places in 1998.

References

External links
, including photo from 1996, at Maryland Historical Trust

Houses on the National Register of Historic Places in Maryland
Houses completed in 1800
Houses in Hagerstown, Maryland
National Register of Historic Places in Washington County, Maryland